Windswept Acres, or the Powers House, is a historic house on New Hampshire Route 31 in Goshen, New Hampshire.  Built about 1800, it is one of Goshen's oldest houses, and one of a cluster of plank-frame houses in the community.  The house was listed on the National Register of Historic Places in 1985.

Description and history
It is a -story Cape style plank-frame house, seven bays wide, with a gabled roof and shingled exterior. Its front entry is off-center, and is framed by simple molding and topped by a four-light transom window. There are two sash windows to its left and four to its right. A three-bay ell extends from the south of the main block, and there is an enclosed porch attached to the rear. A garage is connected to the north side of the house by a breezeway.

Built about 1800, the house is one of the oldest houses in Goshen.  It is built with a distinctive horizontal plank framing method (as distinguished from other local examples where the framing is vertical) laid across a more typical box frame.

See also
National Register of Historic Places listings in Sullivan County, New Hampshire

References

Houses on the National Register of Historic Places in New Hampshire
Houses completed in 1800
Houses in Goshen, New Hampshire
National Register of Historic Places in Sullivan County, New Hampshire